Shawn Travis Kemp Sr. (born November 26, 1969) is an American former professional basketball player who played for the Seattle SuperSonics, Cleveland Cavaliers, Portland Trail Blazers, and Orlando Magic in the National Basketball Association (NBA). Nicknamed "Reign Man", he was a six-time NBA All-Star and a three-time All-NBA Second Team member.

Early years
Kemp attended Concord High School in Elkhart, Indiana. At the prestigious B/C All-Star Camp on his first day, Kemp outplayed highly regarded prep star Terry Mills. A four-year varsity starter, he was considered to be one of the top four or five players nationally his senior year, and led his team to the state championship finals. Kemp ended his high school career as Elkhart County's all-time leading scorer and the owner of Concord's career, single-game and single-season scoring records. Despite his achievements and accolades, Kemp was bypassed for the title of Indiana Mr. Basketball as Woody Austin won the award that year instead. There has been some speculation that Kemp was purposely passed over for the award because he verbally committed to the University of Kentucky and did not express interest in staying in-state to play college ball (Austin committed to Purdue University.) Kemp was selected to the 1988 McDonald's High School All-American team (considered one of the best classes of all-time), along with such notable players as Alonzo Mourning. Kemp scored a team-high 18 points for the West in a losing cause. The final score was 105–99 in favor of the East.

During his senior year, Kemp signed a national letter-of-intent to play basketball at the University of Kentucky. Kemp failed to score the minimum of 700 on the Scholastic Aptitude Test, or SAT, and was forced to miss his freshman year under the NCAA's Proposition 48 rules. Jim Hahn, Kemp's high school coach, did not like the idea of Kemp being in Kentucky without playing basketball, saying "To have Shawn in a college environment without basketball, the one thing he loves, was, I felt, a big mistake. It even crossed my mind to advise him to go right into the NBA and the only thing that stopped me was the fact that so few players have done it." Kemp decided to enroll at Kentucky. However, he left the team in November 1988 after he was accused of pawning two gold chains that had been reported stolen from his teammate Sean Sutton, the son of then Kentucky head coach Eddie Sutton. Sean Sutton did not press charges but Kemp transferred to Trinity Valley Community College in Texas. After a semester at TVCC, where he did not play, 19-year-old Kemp declared himself eligible for the 1989 NBA draft.

Professional career

Seattle SuperSonics (1989–1997)
The Seattle SuperSonics drafted Kemp in the first round of the 1989 NBA draft. Although extremely athletic, Kemp was the youngest player in the NBA at that time and struggled to find his place. In his first season in Seattle, Kemp was mentored heavily by teammate Xavier McDaniel. As the season progressed, so did Kemp's skills, which propelled him into stardom. Kemp began to find his place in the NBA as a star during his second season with the SuperSonics. Together with Gary Payton, Eddie Johnson, Ricky Pierce and Nate McMillan, they became a highly successful squad.

After Kemp's second NBA season, he picked up the nickname "Reign Man" after the SuperSonics' announcer Kevin Calabro saw a poster with the name and thought it fitting to add to his radio broadcasts.

In 1992 during a playoff game against the Golden State Warriors, Kemp dunked over center Alton Lister, which colloquially became known as "The Lister Blister".

Kemp played for the US national team in the 1994 FIBA World Championship in Toronto, winning the gold medal. He also appeared in the MTV Rock N' Jock annual celebrity basketball game.

Kemp's career peaked in 1995–96, when he and Payton led the SuperSonics to a franchise-record 64 wins and their first NBA Finals appearance since 1979. They faced Michael Jordan and the Chicago Bulls, who were coming off an NBA record 72 wins. The SuperSonics pushed the heavily favored Bulls to six games before losing. In the Finals, Kemp posted per game averages of 23.3 points on 55% shooting from the field, 10.0 rebounds and two blocks. Shawn Kemp finished a close second in Finals MVP voting, almost becoming the second player to win the award despite being from the losing team.

During his time in Seattle, Kemp occasionally played during the offseason on an outdoor court in Seattle's Belltown district.

Kemp signed a contract extension with the SuperSonics in 1994. The league's collective bargaining agreement (CBA) precluded any adjustment to that contract until October 1997. He was upset by the situation, but his agent, Tony Dutte, understood that no negotiation was permitted. During this time, the SuperSonics signed Jim McIlvaine to a seven-year, $33.6 million contract, exceeding Kemp's salary. Kemp threatened to refuse to play in the upcoming 1996–97 season and held out of training camp for 22 days. Despite this absence, Kemp helped lead the SuperSonics to another 50-plus-win season as they dispatched the Phoenix Suns in five games in the first round, only to lose to the Hakeem Olajuwon, Clyde Drexler and Charles Barkley-led Houston Rockets in a seven-game series in the second round of the NBA Playoffs. Following the 1996–1997 season, Kemp was part of a trade sending him to the Cleveland Cavaliers, Milwaukee Bucks forward Vin Baker to the SuperSonics, and Terrell Brandon and Tyrone Hill from the Cavaliers to the Bucks.

Cleveland Cavaliers (1997–2000)
Kemp played three seasons with the Cavaliers while battling weight problems and often appeared to lack the drive that made him such a force in Seattle. Despite this, he posted career-high numbers for points per game in 1997–98 and led the Cavaliers to the NBA Playoffs, where they faced the Reggie Miller-led Indiana Pacers. The Cavaliers lost to the Pacers in four games despite Kemp averaging 26 points with 13 rebounds per game in the series.

During the lockout shortened 1998–1999 NBA season, Kemp reportedly showed up to training camp weighing 280 pounds, though Cleveland's then general manager Wayne Embry revealed that he was actually 315 pounds. Other sources cite Kemp's weight as being "north of 400 pounds, easy."    Though unable to shed the weight, Kemp managed to average 20.5 points and 9.2 rebounds.

Portland Trail Blazers (2000–2002)
Kemp was then traded to the Portland Trail Blazers after the 1999–2000 season. The trade reunited Kemp with Bob Whitsitt, who had originally brought Kemp to Seattle. However, Kemp's play began to decline significantly. The last few years of Kemp's professional basketball career were riddled with problems stemming from his weight, as well as cocaine and alcohol abuse. His first season in Portland ended early when he entered drug rehabilitation.

After two seasons with the Blazers, Kemp was waived prior to the 2002–03 season.

Orlando Magic (2002–2003)
Kemp was signed as a free agent for the Magic, and helped the Magic reach the playoffs despite the loss of starting small forward Grant Hill. During his one season in Orlando, Kemp played in his 1000th NBA game. In their first round series, the Magic took an early three games to one lead before losing to the Detroit Pistons in seven games. Following the 2002–03 season, Kemp was replaced by free agent forward Juwan Howard.

Comeback attempts and retirement
In April of the 2005–06 NBA season, Kemp's NBA comeback chances looked promising. The eventual Western Conference champion Dallas Mavericks considered adding Kemp to their roster in time for the NBA playoffs. Mavs' coach, and former Sonic teammate, Avery Johnson scheduled a personal workout to take place in Houston, where Kemp trained for several months. Kemp failed to appear because of undisclosed reasons. The two parties tried to reschedule a workout but the NBA refused to grant Dallas an injury exception (for a 16th player). Kemp did not get a second chance to join the Mavericks that season.

In June 2006, three months after a drug arrest, the Denver Post reported that Kemp had slimmed down to the playing weight of his All-Star days and was determined to join an NBA team, possibly the Denver Nuggets, and finish his career "the right way." The Nuggets ultimately turned their attention away from Kemp, signing power forward Reggie Evans. Kemp drew some interest from the Chicago Bulls in September 2006, but missed his scheduled workout.

During the half time of the SuperSonics' game on November 5, 2006, Kemp was announced as one of the 16 members of the SuperSonics' 40-year anniversary team. After having the longest ovation of all the players, Kemp said after the celebration that he would play with a team in Rome and was still considering a comeback to the NBA. Kemp, however, did not secure a position on an NBA roster during the 2006–07 season.

On August 18, 2008, Kemp signed a one-year contract with Premiata Montegranaro of Italian League. Despite being almost 39, he was said to be in good shape. The Premiata deal came about due to the good relationship between Kemp and Roberto Carmenati, the new Team Director of Montegranaro. Kemp reported to the team, played in three preseason games, then returned to Houston to assess his home for damage from Hurricane Ike. Kemp and Premiata Montegranaro decided to part ways, and the contract was rescinded.

After his active career he tried to bring basketball back to Seattle. Kemp bought a mansion in Seattle in 2003 for $2.4 million, the year he retired from the NBA. In 2008, he listed the property for sale in the real estate market at a value of $3.7 million.

Personal life
Kemp has seven children with six different women. His oldest son, Shawn Kemp Jr., played basketball for the University of Washington and another son, Jamon, played basketball at Southeastern Louisiana University.

Kemp appeared on the 2009 season premiere of Pros vs. Joes. A photograph of Kemp dunking over Hakeem Olajuwon appears on the cover of NBA Jam Extreme.

Kemp was the owner of a sports bar in Lower Queen Anne, Seattle named Oskar's Kitchen. The establishment closed in 2015. Kemp now owns a part of Amber's Kitchen on 1st Avenue in Seattle as well as a controlling interest in several Seattle venues.

In October 2020, Kemp was part of a group that opened a cannabis dispensary in Seattle named Shawn Kemp's Cannabis. He was joined at the grand opening by former teammate Gary Payton, whose Cookies brand cannabis strain he sells at the shop.

Legal problems
On April 4, 2005, Kemp was arrested in Shoreline, Washington, for an investigation of drug possession. Kemp and another man were found with a small amount of cocaine, about 60 grams of marijuana and a semiautomatic pistol, according to the King County Sheriff's Office. On April 29, Kemp was formally charged with drug possession and pleaded guilty. Kemp was again arrested for misdemeanor marijuana possession in Houston, Texas, on July 21, 2006.

On March 8, 2023, Kemp was arrested in Tacoma, Washington, in connection to an alleged drive-by shooting. No charges were filed against Kemp, pending further investigation, and he was released.

Acting 
Kemp had a cameo in Aqua Teen Forever: Plantasm.

Career statistics

Regular season

|-
| 
| style="text-align:left;"|Seattle
| 81 || 1 || 13.8 || .479 || .167 || .736 || 4.3 || .3 || .6 || .9 || 6.5
|-
| style="text-align:left;"|
| style="text-align:left;"|Seattle
| 81 || 66 || 30.1 || .508 || .167 || .661 || 8.4 || 1.8 || 1.0 || 1.5 || 15.0
|-
| style="text-align:left;"|
| style="text-align:left;"|Seattle
| 64 || 23 || 28.3 || .504 || .000 || .748 || 10.4 || 1.3 || 1.1 || 1.9 || 15.5
|-
| style="text-align:left;"|
| style="text-align:left;"|Seattle
| 78 || 68 || 33.1 || .492 || .000 || .712 || 10.7 || 2.0 || 1.5 || 1.9 || 17.8
|-
| style="text-align:left;"|
| style="text-align:left;"|Seattle
| 79 || 73 || 32.9 || .538 || .250 || .741 || 10.8 || 2.6 || 1.8 || 2.1 || 18.1
|-
| style="text-align:left;"|
| style="text-align:left;"|Seattle
| 82 || 79 || 32.7 || .547 || .286 || .749 || 10.9 || 1.8 || 1.2 || 1.5 || 18.7
|-
| style="text-align:left;"|
| style="text-align:left;"|Seattle
| 79 || 76 || 33.3 || .561 || .417 || .742 || 11.4 || 2.2 || 1.2 || 1.6 || 19.6
|-
| style="text-align:left;"|
| style="text-align:left;"|Seattle
| 81 || 75 || 34.0 || .510 || .364 || .742 || 10.0 || 1.9 || 1.5 || 1.0 || 18.7
|-
| style="text-align:left;"|
| style="text-align:left;"|Cleveland
| 80 || 80 || 34.6 || .445 || .250 || .727 || 9.3 || 2.5 || 1.4 || 1.1 || 18.0
|-
| style="text-align:left;"|
| style="text-align:left;"|Cleveland
| 42 || 42 || 35.1 || .482 || .500 || .789 || 9.2 || 2.4 || 1.1 || 1.1 || 20.5
|-
| style="text-align:left;"|
| style="text-align:left;"|Cleveland
| 82 || 82 || 30.4 || .417 || .333 || .776 || 8.8 || 1.7 || 1.2 || 1.2 || 17.8
|-
| style="text-align:left;"|
| style="text-align:left;"|Portland
| 68 || 3 || 15.9 || .407 || .364 || .771 || 3.8 || 1.0 || .7 || .3 || 6.5
|-
| style="text-align:left;"|
| style="text-align:left;"|Portland
| 75 || 5 || 16.4 || .430 || .000 || .794 || 3.8 || .7 || .6 || .4 || 6.1
|-
| style="text-align:left;"|
| style="text-align:left;"|Orlando
| 76 || 55 || 20.7 || .418 || .000 || .742 || 5.7 || .7 || .8 || .4 || 6.8
|- class="sortbottom"
| style="text-align:center;" colspan="2"|Career
| 1,051 || 728 || 27.9 || .488 || .277 || .741 || 8.4 || 1.6 || 1.1 || 1.2 || 14.6
|- class="sortbottom"
| style="text-align:center;" colspan="2"|All-Star
| 6 || 5 || 20.0 || .458 || .200 || .750 || 5.8 || 1.7 || 1.0 || .7 || 9.0

Playoffs

|-
| style="text-align:left;"|1991
| style="text-align:left;"|Seattle
| 5 || 5 || 29.8 || .386 || .000 || .815 || 7.2 || 1.2 || .6 || .8 || 13.2
|-
| style="text-align:left;"|1992
| style="text-align:left;"|Seattle
| 9 || 9 || 37.6 || .475 ||  || .763 || 12.2 || .4 || .6 || 1.6 || 17.4
|-
| style="text-align:left;"|1993
| style="text-align:left;"|Seattle
| 19 || 19 || 34.9 || .512 ||  || .809 || 10.0 || 2.6 || 1.5 || 2.1 || 16.5
|-
| style="text-align:left;"|1994
| style="text-align:left;"|Seattle
| 5 || 5 || 41.2 || .371 ||  || .667 || 9.8 || 3.4 || 2.0 || 2.4 || 14.8
|-
| style="text-align:left;"|1995
| style="text-align:left;"|Seattle
| 4 || 4 || 40.0 || .579 || 1.000 || .821 || 12.0 || 2.8 || 2.0 || 1.8 || 24.8
|-
| style="text-align:left;"|1996
| style="text-align:left;"|Seattle
| 20 || 20 || 36.0 || .570 || .000 || .795 || 10.4 || 1.5 || 1.2 || 2.0 || 20.9
|-
| style="text-align:left;"|1997
| style="text-align:left;"|Seattle
| 12 || 12 || 36.8 || .486 || .200 || .829 || 12.3 || 3.0 || 1.2 || 1.3 || 21.6
|-
| style="text-align:left;"|1998
| style="text-align:left;"|Cleveland
| 4 || 4 || 38.0 || .465 ||  || .844 || 10.3 || 2.0 || 1.3 || 1.0 || 26.0
|-
| style="text-align:left;"|2002
| style="text-align:left;"|Portland
| 3 || 0 || 11.7 || .286 ||  || .700 || 2.7 || .0 || .3 || .0 || 3.7
|-
| style="text-align:left;"|2003
| style="text-align:left;"|Orlando
| 7 || 0 || 10.3 || .381 ||  || .833 || 2.1 || .0 || .0 || .0 || 3.0
|- class="sortbottom"
| style="text-align:center;" colspan="2"|Career
| 88 || 78 || 33.4 || .498 || .200 || .797 || 9.7 || 1.8 || 1.1 || 1.6 || 17.3

See also

 List of National Basketball Association career turnovers leaders
 List of National Basketball Association players with most blocks in a game

References

External links

1969 births
Living people
1994 FIBA World Championship players
African-American basketball players
American men's basketball players
Basketball players from Indiana
Businesspeople in the cannabis industry
Cleveland Cavaliers players
FIBA World Championship-winning players
McDonald's High School All-Americans
National Basketball Association All-Stars
Orlando Magic players
Parade High School All-Americans (boys' basketball)
People from Elkhart, Indiana
Portland Trail Blazers players
Power forwards (basketball)
Seattle SuperSonics draft picks
Seattle SuperSonics players
Trinity Valley Community College alumni
United States men's national basketball team players
University of Kentucky alumni
21st-century African-American people
20th-century African-American sportspeople